The Lord-Lieutenant of Lincolnshire is the British monarch's personal representative in the county of Lincolnshire. Historically, the lord-lieutenant was responsible for organising the county's militia. In 1871, the lord-lieutenant's responsibility over the local militia was removed. However, it was not until 1921 that they formally lost the right to call upon able-bodied men to fight when needed. Since 1660, all lord-lieutenants have also been Custos Rotulorum of Lincolnshire.

The lord-lieutenancy is now an honorary titular position, usually awarded to a retired notable person in the county. Until 1975, this had been awarded to a peer connected to the county.

List of Lord-Lieutenants of Lincolnshire

This is a list of people who have served as Lord-Lieutenant of Lincolnshire.

List of Vice Lord-Lieutenants of Lincolnshire
The lord-lieutenant selects from their deputy lieutenants one to act as the vice lord-lieutenant during their tenure. This office is not automatically renewed on the appoint of a new lord-lieutenant.

The current Vice Lord-Lieutenant of Lincolnshire is Mr Andrew Clark.

List of Deputy Lieutenants
A deputy lieutenant of Lincolnshire is commissioned by the Lord Lieutenant of Lincolnshire. Deputy lieutenants support the work of the lord-lieutenant. There can be several deputy lieutenants at any time, depending on the population of the county. Their appointment does not terminate with the changing of the lord-lieutenant, but they usually retire at age 75.

18th Century
12 December 1798: Henry Hutton, Esq.
4 September 1799: James Conington, Esq.
5 September 1799: Joseph Livesey, Esq.

19th Century
4 May 1813: Henry Smith, Esq.

The current Deputy Lieutenants for Lincolnshire are:
 Mrs J M Ashton 
 A E Baxter Esq 
 Lady Benton Jones 
 N D S Brown Esq 
 J B Burke Esq 
 Mrs C E Carlbom Flinn 
 D C Chambers Esq 
 A S Clark Esq 
 Mrs A C Coltman 
 R J Douglas Esq 
 H C Drake Esq 
 F J F M Dymoke Esq 
 Colonel D K Harris 
 Mrs J G A M Hughes }
 Mrs P G Keeling 
 Ms U F R Lidbetter }
 J W Lockwood Esq 
 B Marsh Esq 
 N E McCorquodale Esq 
 Mrs R M Parker 
 Air Chief Marshal Sir Stuart Peach 
 Mrs V M Pettifer 
 C A Pinchbeck Esq 
 Mrs S A L Price 
 Mrs H M L Reeve 
 Professor M A Robinson 
 Mrs S E Robinson 
 C G Rowles Nicholson Esq 
 Sir Reginald Sheffield 
 Sir Reginald Tyrwhitt 
 Mrs A L Ward 
 W S Webb Esq 
 C W H Welby Esq

References
 

 
History of Lincolnshire
Lincolnshire